Metro Toronto Convention Centre (originally and still colloquially Metro Convention Centre, and sometimes MTCC), is a convention complex located in Toronto, Ontario, Canada along Front Street West in the former Railway Lands in downtown Toronto. The property is today owned by Oxford Properties. The centre is operated by the Metropolitan Toronto Convention Centre Corporation, an independent agency of the Government of Ontario.

Description
The MTCC has  of space, and is home to the 1232-seat John Bassett Theatre. To the east end of the complex is the 586-room InterContinental Toronto Centre hotel (formerly Canadian National Railway's L'Hotel CN).  At the west end of the complex is a 265,000 square foot Class-B office building. Within the office building is the Pint restaurant, which was formerly a Baton Rouge from 2006 to 2017 and a Planet Hollywood from 1996 to 2006. A south building containing exhibition space is located south of the rail lines, on Bremner Boulevard.

The centre is connected to the Union Station railway and transit station through the SkyWalk, and is also accessible via the underground PATH system. The centre is also connected by the Skywalk system to the nearby Rogers Centre and large conventions or exhibitions will sometimes also use it as an additional venue.

According to a 2018 report, over the past 34 years, the MTCC has hosted over 20,000 events and has added  in direct spending economic impact to the community. Direct spending economic impact is created when conference, trade and public show attendees spend on dining, hotel nights, shopping, transportation and more in Toronto. Based on the Ontario Tourism Regional Economic Impact Model (TREIM), the MTCC also sustained a record-breaking 7,622 jobs in the community in its 2017/18 fiscal year.

History
The site was formerly federally owned Railway Lands. Prior to the early 1980s, the site was home to tail end tracks and a parking lot. During the 1970s, the site was part of the proposed and failed "Metro Centre" development which sought to convert the large rail lands in one large development. Development instead proceeded in parcel-by-parcel fashion, with developments such as Roy Thomson Hall, the CN Tower and the SkyDome stadium (renamed Rogers Centre in 2005). The rail yards were transferred to new locations north and east of Toronto. The main rail lines south of the centre were retained.

The convention centre and hotel was completed in 1984, built by CN Real Estate designed by Architects Crang and Boake. In 1995, ownership was transferred to Canada Lands Corporation, an agency of the Government of Canada. A new largely underground addition, designed by Bregman + Hamann Architects, was added south of the railways, east of the CN Tower in 1997 to expand convention space. In April 2011, the Canada Lands Corporation announced that the centre and hotel was for sale. OMERS-owned Oxford Properties won the rights to the complex in August 2011. The complex was adjacent to other Oxford-owned properties at 315 and 325 Front Street.

In October 2012, Oxford Properties proposed the re-development of the site with an updated convention centre, casino, hotel and retail complex. The current MTCC complex would be demolished and replaced with a new complex.

In January 2021, a site at the convention centre opened as a large-scale clinic for distribution of the COVID-19 vaccine during the COVID-19 pandemic in Toronto.

Events
The centre has hosted many large-scale events over the years. The G-20 summit was held at the centre on June 26 and June 27, 2010. It was the same venue for the 14th G7 summit held in 1988. The 1985 NHL Entry Draft was held at the centre.  It has also hosted the XVI International AIDS Conference in 2006.  As well, it has played host to Toronto auditions for So You Think You Can Dance Canada and Canadian Idol.   It has also been the site of numerous political conventions, and was the annual home of the NHL Awards.  Fan Expo & Enthusiast Gaming Live Expo (EGLX) is held here, as well as the Canadian International Auto Show. The 2016 Microsoft Worldwide Partner Conference was held here as well.

In 2011, on the occasion of Art Toronto the artist Achim Zeman presented an installation at the entrance-hall of the building called  Str@del: Eight columns, walls, the ceiling and the reception were covered in red and matte white fluorescent foils. The stripes, wide and narrow surrounded the architectural space, and because of their arrangement left the impression on the viewer as if he was experiencing countless whirlpools, which swirled around him.

Gallery

See also
Other convention venues in Canada, or the Greater Toronto Area:
 International Centre in Mississauga
 Enercare Centre at Exhibition Place
 Toronto Congress Centre in Etobicoke

References

External links

 
 Building data from Emporis.com

Convention centres in Canada
Buildings and structures in Toronto
Event venues established in 1984
Oxford Properties
Railway Lands
1984 establishments in Ontario